Sussie may refer to:

Arts, entertainment, and media
 Sussie 4, a Mexican electronic music duo
 Slim Susie (Swedish: Smala Sussie), a 2003 Swedish comedy-crime film
 Sussie, a character in the animated sitcom The Amazing World of Gumball

People
 Sussie Eriksson (born 1963), Swedish singer and actress
 Sussie Pedersen (born 1960), Danish wheelchair curler

See also
 Susie (disambiguation)
 Sussy (disambiguation)